Samuel Harris Rolfe (February 18, 1924 – July 10, 1993) was an American screenwriter best known for creating (with Herb Meadow) the 1950-60s highly rated CBS television series Have Gun – Will Travel, as well as his work on the 1960s NBC television series The Man from U.N.C.L.E. and The Eleventh Hour.

Background
Rolfe was born in New York City. He scored an Oscar nomination with his first screenplay, the Anthony Mann Western The Naked Spur in 1953.

The Man from U.N.C.L.E.
Most of Rolfe's subsequent career was spent in television, where he created and was part of the writing staff on the highly regarded western series Have Gun – Will Travel and, most famously, The Man from U.N.C.L.E. When Ian Fleming was unable to continue development of the U.N.C.L.E. concept, producer Norman Felton approached Rolfe, who was at that time working on The Eleventh Hour. Rolfe wrote the pilot for U.N.C.L.E. "The Vulcan Affair", and came up with the U.N.C.L.E. acronym.

Rolfe left the show at the end of its first season. After his departure U.N.C.L.E. changed direction and exchanged tongue-in-cheek humour for more overt gags, culminating in the high-camp third season. Rolfe did not approve of the change in direction and felt the show lost its way after the first season. In an interview given shortly before his death he commented:
 I've always felt U.N.C.L.E. was a show that needed a particular kind of a mind to direct it. You needed somebody that could do drama and then also lay humor into it but could sense when the humor had to be stopped and when you had to make the drama take over. And you could talk forever about it, but unless you walk in with that instinct, you're not going to get it. And I think that some of the people that followed me didn't have an instinct for it. So they got silly with it... They never sat down, they didn't really grasp the drama - that you had to have the dramatic spine.
Rolfe made a cameo appearance in one U.N.C.L.E. episode, "The Giuoco Piano Affair", where he played a Texan in the party-scene at Marion Raven's apartment. Robert Vaughn, who played Napoleon Solo in the series, called Rolfe "the real man from U.N.C.L.E."

Rolfe was twice nominated for an Emmy Award, first for Have Gun – Will Travel, and later for The Man from U.N.C.L.E.

Later career
He continued to work as a producer and screenwriter right up until his death. His most notable contribution in later life was to the Star Trek: The Next Generation episode "The Vengeance Factor" and the Star Trek: Deep Space Nine episode "Vortex".

He died of a heart attack in 1993, aged 69, after collapsing while playing tennis. He was survived by his wife Hilda and two children.

References

External links

1924 births
1993 deaths
American male screenwriters
American television writers
American male television writers
Writers from New York City
20th-century American male writers
20th-century American screenwriters